Don Kendrick is a former association football player who represented New Zealand at international level.

Kendrick made his full All Whites debut in a 2–0 win over Fiji on 7 September 1952  and ended his international playing career with five A-international caps and four goals to his credit, his final cap an appearance in a 5–3 win over Tahiti on 28 September 1952.

References 

Year of birth missing (living people)
Living people
New Zealand association footballers
New Zealand international footballers
Association footballers not categorized by position